Leonard Bilson (1616–1695) was M.P. for Petersfield during the late 17th century.

Bilson was born on 5 December 1616, the third (second surviving) son of Sir Thomas Bilson  of West Mapledurham and his wife  Susanna, daughter of Sir William Uvedale . He was educated at University College, Oxford, graduating B.A. on 5 February 1635, and M.A. on 31 October 1637. His son Thomas succeeded him as MP.

References

People from Petersfield
17th-century English people
English MPs 1661–1679
English MPs 1679
English MPs 1680–1681
1616 births
1695 deaths
Alumni of University College, Oxford